Rabobank (full name: Coöperatieve Rabobank U.A.) is a Dutch multinational banking and financial services company headquartered in Utrecht, Netherlands. The group comprises 89 local Dutch Rabobanks (2019), a central organisation (Rabobank Nederland), and many specialised international offices and subsidiaries. Food and agribusiness constitute the primary international focus of the Rabobank Group. Rabobank is the second-largest bank in the Netherlands in terms of total assets.

A 2013 scandal resulted in a $1 billion fine for unscrupulous trading practices, which included the manipulation of LIBOR currency rates worldwide. Chief Executive Piet Moerland resigned immediately as a result.

In terms of Tier 1 capital, the organisation is among the 30 largest financial institutions in the world. As of December 2014, total assets amount to €681 billion with a net profit of €1.8 billion. Global Finance ranks Rabobank 25th in its survey of "the world's safest banks".

History
Rooted in agriculture, Rabobank is set up as a federation of local credit unions that offer services to the local markets.

Creation of farmers' banks 
The bank was rooted in the ideas of Friedrich Wilhelm Raiffeisen, the founder of the cooperative movement of credit unions, who in 1864 created the first farmers' bank in Germany. Being a countryside mayor he was confronted with the abject poverty of the farmers and their families. He tried to alleviate this need through charitable aid, but realised that self-reliance had more potential in the long run, and thus converted his charitable foundation into a farmers' bank in 1864. In doing so he created the Darlehnskassen-Verein, which collected the savings of countryside dwellers and provided enterprising farmers with loans.

This model found a lot of interest in the Netherlands at the end of the 19th century. One of the first of Raiffeisen's followers was Father Gerlacus van den Elsen, who stood at the basis of a number of local farmers' banks in the south of the Netherlands. The model caught on being championed by the clergy and the countryside elites. The mission of the farmers' lending banks was an idealistic one, but they always operated using strict business principles. Controversially, a founding principle of Rabobank's cooperative style was to cooperate in the interest of "warding off the Shylock" . The cooperative bank model assured a tight bond between invested capital and the community.

Early cooperation 
The bank's traditional headquarters are Utrecht and Eindhoven. In 1898, two cooperative bank conglomerates were formed:
 Coöperatieve Centrale Raiffeisen-Bank in Utrecht
 Coöperatieve Centrale Boerenleenbank in Eindhoven

Raiffeisen-Bank was formed as a cooperative of six local banks, while Boerenleenbank was a cooperative of 22 local banks. These two existed side by side for three-quarters of a century despite their obvious similarities. The reasons for this owed in part to legal disagreements. The most important difference, however, was cultural. The Eindhoven-based Boerenleenbank had a decidedly Catholic signature while the Raiffeisen-Bank had a Protestant background. In the past the Netherlands underwent a process of pillarisation (Dutch: verzuiling), which in practice meant that members of different religious congregations and political movements essentially lived side by side, without contact between the two. A consequence of this pillarisation was that many villages hosted not one but two local banks, one each for Catholics and Protestants. The close-knit community banking that resulted helped these banks to better control their risks. Consequently, when the Dutch banking sector was devastated by a financial crisis in the early 1920s, these local banks survived largely unscathed. The religious backgrounds found their way to their organisational structures, as well; Boerenleenbank was highly centralised, while Raiffeisen-Bank promoted local autonomy.

Merger 
By 1940, the two organisations cooperated with each other, albeit on a limited scale. Three major developments caused a further tightening of the bonds between the two:
 An increase in the number of branches, leading to increased local competition
 A gradual fading of the confessional differences between the two
 An increasing demand for capital in the Dutch industry, which in turn led to higher concentration in the banking business

In 1972, the two organisations merged to form Coöperatieve Centrale Raiffeisen-Boerenleenbank, or Rabobank for short. The organisation chose Amsterdam to be its statutory headquarters due to its historical neutrality in relation to the founding organisations. From 1980 to 2015, the central organisation was referred to as Rabobank Nederland.

Overseas expansion 
In 1980, Rabobank expanded its international activities as part of its mission to finance global agriculture. In 1990, it established a joint-venture bank in Indonesia by partnering with a local bank, Bank Duta, to form RabobankDuta. Bank Duta subsequently collapsed in the 1998 Asian financial crisis, and Rabobank bought Duta's share to operate solely as PT Bank Rabobank International Indonesia. In 1994, it purchased Primary Industry Bank of Australia (PIBA), which had operations in Australia and New Zealand, and renamed it Rabobank Australia Limited in 2003. In 1997, it purchased New Zealand–based Wrightson Farmers Finance Limited and renamed it Rabobank New Zealand in 1999. Rabobank became a significant lender to the rural sector in New Zealand with this purchase and used this as a base to expand its lending business further.

Rabobank purchased Australian company Lend Lease Agro Business in 2003. In 2008, it expanded its operations in Indonesia by buying two retail banks, Bank Haga and Bank Hagakita. The bank has offices in 38 countries. Utrecht-America Holdings, Inc. and Rabobank N.A. operate as subsidiaries of the Rabobank Group in the United States. In 2019, it was announced that Rabobank sold its American retail business to Mechanics Bank, with all Rabobank branches taking the Mechanics name. Rabobank will continue to do business in North America related to Food and Agriculture based-lending under its subsidiary Rabo AgriFinance.

Direct banking 
In 2002, it launched a new internet only savings bank called Rabobank.be. A second online savings banks was launched in 2005 in Ireland under the name of RaboDirect, and then as RaboPlus in New Zealand and two years later in Australia. After a small hiatus new online banks were opened in Poland (2011) and Germany (2012). The advertising campaigns used to promote the savings business in Ireland and New Zealand raised the profile of Rabobank generally in those countries resulting in an increase in not only its savings business but also in its lending businesses. In 2010, Rabobank decided to use the same brand name in Australia and New Zealand for the savings bank and replaced RaboPlus with RaboDirect in these countries. In 2014, Rabobank worked with Vasco, now OneSpan, to create a new online authentication system using QR codes.

Acquisitions 
Rabobank completed the acquisition of Mid-State Bank & Trust on May 1, 2007, which allows Rabo to expand its services to the Central Coast region of California, United States. In 2010, it also acquired Pacific State Bank, expanding into the Central Valley of California. Rabobank's branches in the United States were sold to Mechanics Bank in 2019.

Development 
Right from the start the cooperative banks prospered. They managed to perform the key tasks of a banking organisation, that is, bringing excess capital and capital shortages together. These moneylenders stood close to the farmers and were better in judging the creditworthiness of individual farmers than the city banks. This allowed the banks to offer lower interest rates. The local banks were self-governed by members of the cooperation. They adhered to the principle of non-remunerated management and elected the board and the commissioners from among themselves. Only the cashier received a small salary. This has changed, but even as recently as in late 1950s the local bank office was nothing more than the cashier's living room, he generally performed his administrative duties besides another regular job. Much later, in the 1960s the most local banks moved into new and modern offices that reflected their new-found professionalism. The position cashier was replaced by a local bank director. Since 1998 the local bank director is an appointed professional banker and he presides over a board of directors which is chosen from among the members.

Local presence and local autonomy were always important but this hasn't stopped a wave of concentration of the local banks. The major rationale behind this was the need to attain economies of scale in the fields of payments, transaction, processing, staff and capital. Increasing customer demand for standardized and widely available products also played a significant part in this development. Currently the motto is:

this applies to the size of the local bank offices.

Traditionally the bank served mostly farmers and small businesses. Since the introduction of consumer salary accounts in the 1960s the number of retail clients grew exponentially. This has led to Rabobank being a prominent player in the field of savings accounts, checking accounts and mortgages in the Netherlands.

In June 2012, rating agency Moody's downgraded Rabobank's to Aa2 (previously Aaa), with a negative outlook. Due to a new rating methodology in November 2011 by rating agency Standard & Poor's, the credit status was downgraded two steps from AAA to AA. In November 2014, S&P lowered the rating from AA- to A+ with a negative outlook. Rating agency Fitch rates the credit status of the bank AA-, with a negative outlook.

As per the new strategy, Rabobank is planning to exit some markets. In September 2014, Rabobank sold Bank BGZ to BNP Paribas for $1.39 billion.

Unlike most major banks, Rabobank's central organisation was originally a subsidiary of the local branches. However, new banking regulations made a new arrangement necessary. In late 2015, on the recommendation of a specially-created Governance Committee, Rabobank's 106 cooperative banks voted unanimously to merge with Rabobank Nederland. The merger took effect on 1 January 2016. While the 106 Rabobanks still have considerable autonomy, the central organisation is now the parent body.

A 2013 scandal resulted in a $1 billion fine for unscrupulous trading practices, which included the manipulation of LIBOR currency rates worldwide. Chief Executive Piet Moerland resigned immediately as a result.

Job cuts
In December 2015, Rabobank announced to cut 9,000 jobs by 2018 (3,000 jobs by the end of 2016) and almost a fifth of its current workforce. The policy was to comply with the tougher Basel IV rulebook.

Organisation structure

The Rabobank Group consists of a network of local banks, Rabobank Nederland and several daughter organisations.

Previously, the local Rabobanks were the mother organisation of Rabobank Nederland, their central organisation. The local banks were facilitated by Rabobank Nederland to serve their customers, not the other way around as is often the case with traditional banking organisations. Employees of the group did not routinely speak of a headquarters but preferred to speak of Rabobank Nederland, which was their daughter organisation. In 2016, however, the local banks merged with Rabobank Nederland, while retaining significant independence.

Even before 2016, the central organisation occasionally overruled the autonomy of the local bank organisations. In accordance with Dutch regulations in the field of credit and financial services Rabobank Nederland oversees that the local banks maintain a required level of prudence and professionalism while selling financial products. This has grown to be especially important in view of international standards such as Sarbanes–Oxley Act, Basel II and IFRS. This leads to a rather unusual phenomenon within international business: the mother companies and the much larger daughter are essentially forced to coexist in order to function properly. This has led to a very ambivalent relationship between the two over the years.

At the time of the merger there were five management instruments within Rabobank Nederland:
 Algemene Vergadering – general assembly. The boards of all local banks within the cooperation were represented there.
 De Centrale Kringvergadering – advisory board manned by representatives of clusters of local banks.
 De Hoofddirectie – general management. Theoretically they were an autonomous management organ, but in practice, they had to pay 'serious consideration' to what the 4th organ; Raad van Beheer; thought about the course of action for the organisation.
 Raad van Beheer – management council. An independent advisory council whose chairman also attended the meetings of De Hoofddirectie.
 Raad van Toezicht – supervisory board

In 2002 this structure was simplified. The Raad van Beheer was disbanded. De Hoofddirectie received an integral authority over the banking business. It was also renamed to Raad van Bestuur or board of directors. They have an added task compared to a traditional board i.e., they are expected to look out for the specific interests of the members (local banks and their certificate holders). The Raad van Toezicht was renamed to county commission and now held an independent supervisory role. The chairman of this board also presides over the Centrale Kringvergadering. The latter is the most distinguishing organ as compared to other financial institutions in the Netherlands and abroad.

Market position

Rabobank is traditionally a farmers' bank and it still holds an 85% to 90% market share in the agrarian sector in the Netherlands. Throughout the years, the company has also started targeting small and medium-sized companies. By the mid 1970s the market share in this sector reached some 30% and currently amounts to approximately 40%. In 1987, an important milestone was reached; the total outstanding loans in sectors other than agriculture exceeded those in the agricultural sector for the first time. By 2005 the agricultural credits amounted to some 8% of total outstanding credit.

Rabobank also holds some 40% of the total outstanding sums on Dutch savings accounts and they account for approximately 30% of all private consumer mortgages in the Netherlands.

In the Netherlands, Rabobank is the third-largest retail bank by market share, and second largest by number of current accounts at 30%. ING Group is the largest with 40% of current accounts, followed by Rabobank (30%), ABN AMRO (20%), and others (10%).

The Rabobank Group currently consists of the following divisions:

 Rabobank Nederland – the facilitary and staff organisation that serves the local banks. It currently performs the following core activities:
 Market (staff) support for the domestic retail banking business
 Group functions i.e., ICT, Legal and other facilitary departments
 Wholesale banking and international rural and retail banking
 Local Banks – Approximately 89 cooperative local banks in the Netherlands
 Rabo Wholesale Rural & Retail – Rabobank's wholesale banking and investment division
 Rabo Vastgoed Groep – Project developer, real estate
 DLL (De Lage Landen) – vendor finance, leasing and trade finance
 Rembrandt Fusies & Overnames – corporate finance
 Schretlen & Co – asset management, private banking sector
 Obvion – mortgage intermediary
 FGH Bank – Dutch real estate bank
 Rabobank Ireland plc
 Rabobank New Zealand Limited - a registered bank in New Zealand
 Rabo AgriFinance, headquartered in St Louis, Missouri
 ACC Loan Management, Ireland
 Utrecht-America Holdings, Inc. - New York-based U.S. financial holding company
 Rabo Mobiel – a mobile virtual network operator in the Netherlands (2005–2014) 
 Rabo Development, with advisory services and minority participations in various international markets, including: Tanzania, Zambia, Rwanda, Mozambique, China, Brazil and Paraguay.

RaboDirect 
RaboDirect, formerly RaboPlus in some locations is the brand name for online-only services offered by Rabobank. RaboDirect operates in Belgium, the Republic of Ireland, Australia, New Zealand and Germany offering savings accounts, term deposits and managed funds. In Belgium it is known as Rabobank.be.

Ireland 

RaboDirect Ireland was an online savings bank.

In 2009, RaboDirect ran the marketing campaign that included TV commercials which featured staff confessing truths about themselves, and a microsite called Truthbank where customers could "confess" their own truths.

RaboDirect was the sponsor of rugby union's Pro12 from the 2011-12 season until 2013–14, it featured teams from Ireland, Italy, Scotland and Wales. The deal was announced in June 2011, during which time the league was known as the RaboDirect Pro12.

On 21 February RaboDirect announced that it would be closing down its Irish operations from 16 May 2018, with the loss of 31 jobs.

New Zealand 

RaboDirect, originally known as RaboPlus, was launched in February 2006 and was at the time only bank in New Zealand whose parent company was rated AAA by Standard & Poor's (the credit rating has since been downgraded and as of October 2015 is A).

Australia 
On 23 May 2007, Rabobank opened a RaboPlus Internet bank in Australia. On 20 May 2010, the services were rebranded to RaboDirect. RaboDirect is the major partner of the Melbourne Rebels Super Rugby side. By 2011 over $6 billion had been gathered in deposits.

Germany 
On 20 June 2012, Rabobank opened a RaboDirect in Germany. Rabobank has had a presence in Germany since 1984. It has operated in the field of corporate finance and has been primarily active in the food and agriculture sector in the country.

Poland 
Rabobank operated a direct bank in Poland, but under the Bank BGZ operation and using the name "BGZ Optima". The Polish business including BGZ Optima was subsequently sold to French bank BNP Paribas in December 2013 for around $1.4 billion.

Naming rights 
Rabobank has naming rights to several venues and organizations, including:
 Rabobank Arena, Bakersfield, California
 Rabobank Theater and Convention Center, Bakersfield, California
 Rabobank Stadium, Salinas, California
 Rabobank Development Team, cycling team
 Rabobank-Liv/giant, cycling team
 Rabobank Bestuurscentrum, skyscraper, Utrecht

References

External links

 Rabobank Group homepage

Banks of the Netherlands
Cooperatives in the Netherlands
Cooperative banking in Europe
Dutch brands
Banks established in 1972
Companies based in Utrecht (province)
Banks under direct supervision of the European Central Bank
Dutch companies established in 1972